Peter S. Andersen (31 January 1871 – 30 May 1948) was a Danish actor. He appeared in more than 40 films between 1911 and 1944.

Selected filmography
 The Golden Smile (1933)
 Life on the Hegn Farm (1938)

References

External links

1871 births
1948 deaths
Danish male film actors
Place of birth missing